Joseph Eric Newby (born March 8, 1982 in Soldotna, Alaska) is a professional baseball pitcher who is currently with the Amarillo Sox. Newby attended Colorado State University–Pueblo.

Professional career

Oakland Athletics
Newby started his career in 2004, joining the Rookie-Level affiliate of the Oakland Athletics, the AZL Athletics of the Arizona League. Newby went 2-3 with a 4.04 ERA and 46 strikeouts.

In  Newby was promoted to the Vancouver Canadians of the Northwest League. There he compiled a record of 5-5 in 15 starts with a 4.29 ERA.

In his 32 games (all relief appearances), he had a record of 5-0 with a 3.22 ERA.

In  the A's kept him at the Class-A with Kane County. This was Newby's worst season statistically, compiling a 0-3 record and an ERA of 8.59 for only nine games.

Seattle Mariners
Newby did not pitch in  after tearing a ligament in his pitching arm. As a result, he was released by the A's. He played at three levels of the Mariners organization, with the Class-A Advanced High Desert Mavericks, the Double-A West Tenn Diamond Jaxx and the Triple-A Tacoma Rainiers. He is just the third player from Colorado State - Pueblo to reach the Triple-A level. He finished the season a combined 1-1 with a 2.38 ERA and 40 strikeouts in 34 games.

Los Angeles Dodgers
After spending 2010 with the Southern Maryland Blue Crabs in independent baseball, he signed a minor league contract with the Los Angeles Dodgers before the 2011 season. He was assigned to the Double-A Chattanooga Lookouts. After seven games in AA, he was promoted to the Triple-A Albuquerque Isotopes, where he was in 25 games, including 5 starts. Combined he was 4-7 with a 5.55 ERA.

References

External links
Career statistics and player information from Baseball-Reference and Minor League Baseball

1982 births
Living people
Albuquerque Isotopes players
American expatriate baseball players in Canada
Arizona League Athletics players
Baseball pitchers
Baseball players from Arkansas
Chattanooga Lookouts players
CSU Pueblo ThunderWolves baseball players
High Desert Mavericks players
Kane County Cougars players
People from Soldotna, Alaska
Southern Maryland Blue Crabs players
Tacoma Rainiers players
Vancouver Canadians players
West Tennessee Diamond Jaxx players